Turbo (born Isaac Emmanuel Baptiste) is a British street dancer, musician and entertainer from the UK. He is best known for his appearance as a finalist on Sky TV's Got to Dance and CBBC show Turbo Boost.

His credits include appearances in music videos for Madonna, Jamelia, Will Smith, Mis-teeq, Shaznay Lewis and he has also been a backing dancer for Whitney Houston.

References 

British male musicians
British male dancers
Living people
Year of birth missing (living people)